Mai Al Balushi  (born September 14, 1972) is a Kuwaiti actress. She started her career in 2003 when she participated in the work of art on stage or on TV. Her 5 sisters, two of whom are actresses Maram and Hind Al Balushi, and the cousin of actress Haya Al Shuaibi. She currently works as a nurse.

References

1972 births
Living people
Kuwaiti television actresses
Kuwaiti people of Iranian descent
Kuwaiti people of Baloch descent
Kuwaiti stage actresses